Hugh de Audley may refer to:
 Sir Hugh de Audley, 1st Baron Audley of Stratton Audley (c. 1276–1325), English noble
 Hugh de Audley, 1st Earl of Gloucester (c. 1291–1347), English ambassador to France